Charles Bradford Henry (born July 10, 1963) is an American lawyer and politician who served as the 26th governor of Oklahoma from 2003 to 2011. The most recent Democrat to hold the office, he previously served in the Oklahoma Senate from 1992 to 2003.

Henry was elected governor in 2002 with 43% of the vote and reelected for a second term in 2006 with 67% of the vote. He was the third governor and second Democrat in Oklahoma history to serve two consecutive terms, along with Democrat George Nigh and Republican Frank Keating. Henry was unable to seek a third term in the 2010 election due to term limits set by the Oklahoma Constitution. He was succeeded as governor by Republican former Lieutenant  Governor and former U.S  House of Representatives Congresswoman Mary Fallin on January 10, 2011.

Henry had been mentioned as a possible candidate for the U.S. Senate, but declined to run in the 2014 special election to replace Tom Coburn.

Early life and education
Brad Henry was born in Shawnee, Oklahoma, the son of Charles Henry, a prominent judge and former state representative. After graduating from Shawnee High School in 1981, Henry attended the University of Oklahoma as a President's Leadership Scholar and earned a bachelor's degree in economics in 1985. He was a member of Delta Tau Delta fraternity. In 1988, he was awarded his J.D. degree from the University of Oklahoma College of Law, where he served as managing editor of the Law Review.

Henry practiced law in Shawnee, Oklahoma before running for the Oklahoma State Senate. He served as a state senator from 1992 until he became governor.

Gubernatorial campaigns

2002

In the 2002 election for governor, Henry defeated State Senator Enoch Kelly Haney and businessman Vince Orza in the primary election. In the general election, he defeated former Republican Congressman Steve Largent, an NFL Hall of Famer, by just over one-half of one percent of the vote, in a race that also included Independent candidate Gary Richardson, a retired federal prosecutor. Henry received 448,143 votes (43.27%) to Largent's 441,277 votes (42.61%). Richardson, a former Republican candidate, received 146,200 votes (14%).

Henry ran a campaign of "barnstorming" rural areas, and stopping at Wal-Mart stores in an RV with supporters. Henry was endorsed by football coach Barry Switzer, who has widespread popularity in the Sooner State and accompanied Henry to many campaign events.

On the policy side of the campaign, Henry branded himself as the "education governor." He argued for increasing teachers' salaries and funding for higher education in the state by approving a state lottery to raise money.

2006

In the Democratic Party primary election on July 25, 2006, Henry received 218,712 votes, 86% of the vote.

In the November 7 general election, Henry faced Fifth District U.S. Congressman Republican Ernest Istook and won with 66% of the vote. He won with a higher total than any gubernatorial candidate in almost fifty years. He only lost the three counties of the Panhandle, and won by large margins in a number of counties that normally vote Republican.

Governor of Oklahoma

Henry was sworn in as Oklahoma's 26th governor on January 13, 2003, with the oath of office being administered by his cousin, federal appeals court judge Robert Harlan Henry. As governor, he was a member of the National Governors Association, the Southern Governors' Association, and the Democratic Governors Association. He was the president of the Council of State Governments in 2007.

Henry made national headlines by giving sanctuary from the controversial redistricting warrant to Texas Democrats in that state's legislature by allowing them to travel across state lines into Oklahoma en masse to deny a quorum for voting on a redistricting plan. "Our position is that, without a warrant signed by a judge, we have no authority. Even under those circumstances, we are hesitant to get pulled into a Texas political battle. If we're going to do battle with Texas, we prefer that it be on the football field," Henry said through his spokesman.

As a tax-cutting governor, Henry has sought a stance of moderation on most political hot button issues and seemingly has appeal across party lines. Henry is pro-choice and has vetoed legislation to mandate ultrasound viewings prior to abortion procedures. He has a mixed view of racial affirmative action, supporting it in college and graduate schools, but not in hiring for the bureaucracy. Henry supports expanding public healthcare and holding HMOs accountable for poor care; however, he also is in favor of upholding the death penalty and is against gun control. The governor supports tax cuts for the lower and middle classes and believes in keeping the income tax; he also supports using the "War on Drugs" strategy to combat methamphetamine use within his state.

On May 27, 2004, Governor Brad Henry issued Executive Order 04-21, which created the Governor's Ethnic American Advisory Council. The Ethnic American Advisory Council then published an English translation of the Quran embossed with the Oklahoma State seal which was then distributed to 149 Oklahoma state legislators. There were 35 lawmakers who declined to accept the copy of the Quran that they were offered. After refusing the copy of the Quran, Republican State Representative Rex Duncan wrote a letter to his colleagues explaining, "Most Oklahomans do not endorse the idea of killing innocent women and children in the name of ideology." Further, Duncan said during a TV interview  "I think it was inappropriate that they used a state centennial seal on a religious item."

In 2003, Henry signed bills into law that: made downloading child pornography a crime, strengthened the financial oversight of HMOs by the state, created a $300,000 cap on noneconomic damages for obstetric and emergency room cases except in wrongful death cases or if negligence is shown and made other changes to regulate medical liability actions, penalized predatory lending, authorized payday lending, and placed a moratorium on the sale of water from a sole source aquifer. He also was a strong supporter of a ballot proposal to establish a statewide lottery to benefit schools.

In 2004, he signed a bill into law that set out a total of $2,100 in across-the-board salary increases for state employees, public school teachers and state troopers. He also signed legislation to limit the sale of pseudoephedrine used to make crystal meth.

In 2008, he vetoed an anti-abortion measure which required, among other things, women to get an ultrasound before having an abortion. The veto was overridden and was the first override in Oklahoma since 1994, when Gov. David Walters was in office. That law was struck down by a state district court, but passed again in April 2010, whereupon Henry again vetoed it. His veto was again overridden.

Despite high job approval ratings and avoidance of controversy, Oklahoma voters approved a term limit holding the governor to a total length of time of eight years in office. The law already provided for a term limit of two consecutive terms for the governor. This effectively prohibited Henry, then 47, from making a comeback attempt at a later date. However, in 2013, Henry stated the initiative didn't apply to him as he had already been term limited by the State Constitution before the proposition was approved. Supporters had asked Henry to run in the 2014 elections against incumbent Republican governor Mary Fallin, but he declined.

Oklahoma Supreme Court appointments
Governor Henry appointed the following Justices to the Oklahoma Supreme Court:

 James E. Edmondson2003
 Steven W. Taylor2004
 Tom Colbert2004, making Henry the first governor to appoint an African American justice to the Court.
 John F. Reif2007
 Doug Combs2010

Budget proposals
Governor Henry submitted the following budgets to the Oklahoma Legislature:
2004, 2005, 2006, 2007, 2008, 2009, 2010, and 2011.

Legacy
Henry was widely expected to be named President of the University of Central Oklahoma. However, the state's largest newspapers, The Daily Oklahoman and The Tulsa World, both editorialized against the appointment of Henry as UCO president by the UCO Board of Regents, which was appointed by Henry. Another candidate, Don Betz, was named to the position. Henry was considered a likely choice to be Dean of the Oklahoma City University School of Law. However, U.S. Federal Magistrate Valerie Couch was appointed. As governor, Henry appointed 5 members of the Oklahoma Supreme Court and delivered the 2010 commencement address at the OCU School of Law. Henry has strong experience as Oklahoma Senate Judiciary Chairman, OU Law Review Editor and considerable skills in fundraising.

On June 8, 2016, Henry joined the law firm Spencer Fane

Election results

2002

2006

References

External links

Oklahoma Governor Brad Henry official state website
Everett, Dianna. "Henry, Charles Bradford (1963–)" Encyclopedia of Oklahoma History & Culture. Retrieved 10–13–09
 

|-

|-

1963 births
Living people
People from Shawnee, Oklahoma
Democratic Party governors of Oklahoma
Democratic Party Oklahoma state senators
Oklahoma lawyers
Politicians from Oklahoma City
University of Oklahoma alumni
University of Oklahoma College of Law alumni
Lawyers from Oklahoma City
21st-century American politicians
Baptists from Oklahoma
Shawnee High School (Oklahoma) alumni